My Case is a 1986 Portuguese drama- fantasy film directed by Manoel de Oliveira. It entered the main competition at the 43rd Venice International Film Festival.

Cast
 Bulle Ogier as Actrice # 1 
 Luís Miguel Cintra as L'Intrus 
 Axel Bogousslavsky as L'Employé 
 Fred Personne as L'Auteur 
 Wladimir Ivanovsky as Le spectateur 
 Héloïse Mignot as Actrice # 2 
 Grégoire Oestermann as Le projectionniste

References

External links
 

1986 films
1980s French-language films
1986 drama films
Films directed by Manoel de Oliveira
Films produced by Paulo Branco
Portuguese drama films